Alan Marshall Storke (September 27, 1884 - March 18, 1910) was a professional baseball infielder in Major League Baseball from  through . He played for the St. Louis Cardinals and Pittsburgh Pirates.

Storke died of general streptococcus due to empyema before the 1910 season.

See also
 List of baseball players who died during their careers

References

External links

1884 births
1910 deaths
Major League Baseball infielders
St. Louis Cardinals players
Pittsburgh Pirates players
Providence Grays (minor league) players
Auburn (minor league baseball) players
Amherst Mammoths baseball players
Baseball players from New York (state)
Sportspeople from Auburn, New York
Deaths from streptococcus infection